Dim Mak Records is an independent, Los Angeles-based record label, events company, and lifestyle brand founded by Steve Aoki in 1996. The label has released music under the genres of punk, indie rock, hardcore, hip hop, and electronic dance music.

History

Early years
Steve Aoki started Dim Mak Records in 1996 at the age of 19, out of his college apartment at the University of California, Santa Barbara. The label's first release was a 7-inch record by a hardcore punk band called Stickfigurecarousel. The name Dim Mak is a reference to Bruce Lee's Death Touch martial art technique.
Prior to launching Dim Mak, Aoki was involved in the local hardcore punk scene. As a writer for a small zine, Aoki would often receive demos and albums to review. Meanwhile, he began hosting punk and hardcore shows in the living room of his college apartment, which came to be known as The Pickle Patch. Hundreds of acts played in this early space, sometimes in exchange for a place to sleep for the night, including The Rapture, Jimmy Eat World, Atom & His Package, and more. The relationships formed throughout these formative years served as a crucial foundation for what would later become Dim Mak Records. 
In 2001, Dim Mak released one of the label's first nationally recognized projects with the self-titled debut EP from Pretty Girls Make Graves. Following the success of this record along with The Kills’ Black Rooster in 2002, Aoki relocated Dim Mak to Los Angeles, initiating the label's second era.

Indie rock era
In 2003, Dim Mak began to build out its roster through the addition of indie rock artists, beginning with the U.K. band Bloc Party. After mailing Aoki a 7-inch of their track "She's Hearing Voices", the group signed to Dim Mak Records. Shortly afterwards, Dim Mak entered into a partnership with VICE (a subsidiary of Atlantic Records), for the rights to Bloc Party, marking Dim Mak's first deal with a major label. Together, Dim Mak and Atlantic released Bloc Party's debut album Silent Alarm in 2005, which went on to sell over 350,000 physical albums.

Electro era
As underground dance music began incorporating (which was coined electro at the time), Dim Mak shifted with the times and entered its electro era. One of the biggest tracks of this era came when Steve Aoki collaborated with The Bloody Beetroots for "Warp 1.9", the lead single off their debut album Romborama. Thump placed the track at #19 on their 101 Best EDM Songs of All Time list and called it 'Perhaps the definitive track from that particularly fruitful period of hook-laden abrasiveness.'

Around the same time, Dim Mak released an album from Mstrkrft titled Fist of God, which brought major pop and hip-hop collaborators into the electro scene.

New Noise
New Noise is Dim Mak's new music discovery imprint that focuses on cutting-edge sounds from burgeoning artists across the genre spectrum. Launched in 2010, New Noise got its start as a compilation series highlighting fresh faces handpicked by Steve Aoki and crew. By 2015, the platform evolved into a bi-weekly, free-download platform based on singles. Ghastly's underground house single "Every Night" was the first release of many under this format. As of 2016, New Noise's current incarnation is a copyright free model that allows the budding community of Twitch gamers and amateur YouTube content creators to use New Noise music in their videos and live streams sans purchase or fees, all in exchange for linking back to the artists and their music.

Music publishing
Steve Aoki founded Dim Mak Publishing in 2014, as the fourth division of the Dim Mak brand. Since its launch, songs from the Dim Mak Publishing repertoire have landed major sync placements across national advertising campaigns (T-Mobile, Acura), feature films (Sausage Party, Ride Along 2, Why Him?) and TV programs (Transparent, CSI: Cyber). On August 9, 2017, Dim Mak Publishing announced that it had signed a global deal with Warner/Chappell Music, the music publishing arm of Warner Music Group. Warner/Chappell now administers the entire Dim Mak Publishing catalog, which includes a wide variety of dance/electronic works from songwriters such as Autoerotique, Garmiani, Henry Fong, Max Styler, Ookay, Quix, Shaun Frank, Stööki Sound, and Viceroy.

Associated artists

 Steve Aoki
 Atari Teenage Riot
 Autoerotique
 Aviella
 Bloc Party
 The Bloody Beetroots
 Cetana
 Chemical Surf
 The Deadly Syndrome
 Diamond Pistols
 Angger Dimas
 Dimitri Vegas & Like Mike
 Henry Fong
 Shaun Frank
 Garmiani
 Ghastly
 Godlands
 Gossip
 I Wish I
 Keys N Krates
 The Kills
 Lil Jon
 Moistbreezy
 Mstrkrft
 Mustard Pimp
 Oh No Oh My
 Yumi Nu
 Ookay
 Pretty Girls Make Graves
 Quix
 Alvin Risk
 Rob Roy
 Scanners
 Dan Sena
 Sickboy
 Stickfigurecarousel
 Stööki Sound
 Max Styler
 Tiësto
 Viceroy
 WatchTheDuck
 XTRMST
 Zedd
 Zuper Blahq

Notes 

Some Steve Aoki releases are co-released alongside Ultra Records as well as Dim Mak Records, however, they are officially categorized under the Ultra Records discography, it is also the same for other artists such as The Bloody Beetroots.

Events
Dim Mak events have featured performances from a diverse range of acts such as Migos, Lil Uzi Vert, Thomas Bangalter of Daft Punk, Skrillex, Rae Sremmurd, Kid Cudi, Zedd, Lady Gaga, Waka Flocka Flame, Will.i.am, Dillon Francis, Diplo, Justice, Afrojack, Travis Scott, Bloc Party, Borgore, Yellow Claw, and Steve Angello.

Dim Mak Tuesdays
From 2003 to 2014, Dim Mak held weekly events, also known as, Dim Mak Tuesdays event at Dim Mak Studios (previously known as Cinespace) in Hollywood, CA. The list of artists who have performed at Dim Mark Tuesdays includes Lady Gaga, Justice, Diplo, will.i.am, and Daft Punk's Thomas Bangalter.

Festival Stages
To date, Dim Mak has hosted branded Dim Mak Stages at major music festivals around the world, including:

Special events
Dim Mak has an established history of producing special events at key music conferences such as SXSW and Miami Music Week.  Also in 2006 and 2007, Dim Mak produced a medium-scaled music festival in Los Angeles called "Neighborhood".

20th anniversary tour
In 2016, Dim Mak commemorated its 20-year anniversary with 20 events around the world.

Clothing & accessories
In 2014, Dim Mak Collection was launched. From its launch Dim Mak has been worn by celebrities and influencers including Gucci Mane, Migos, David Guetta and Bella Thorne and has been featured in The New York Times, Vogue among others.

In addition to the proprietary Dim Mak Collection has collaborated with other influential clothing and accessory brands on limited edition collections.  Those are listed as:

References

External links
 

 
Alternative rock record labels
American independent record labels
Electronic dance music record labels